Jacek Cuch (born 25 June 1973) is a former Polish footballer who played as a defender.

There is little information on Cuch's early footballing career, but it is known that from at least 1995 until 1998 he played for Polonia Gdańsk. He made 15 appearances and scored 1 goal during the 1995–96 season when Polonia were relegated into the third tier. He was a part of the squad that won the III liga (Gdańsk group) the following season, and made a further 28 appearances in the II liga upon Polonia's return. In 1998 Polonia were involved in a merger with Lechia Gdańsk creating the Lechia-Polonia Gdańsk team. Cuch made his Lechia-Polonia debut on 25 July 1998 against Polonia-Szombierki Bytom. He spent three seasons with Lechia-Polonia, leaving the team in 2001 after the team were relegated to the III liga. In total for Lechia-Polonia he made a total of 19 appearances, and jointly for Lechia-Polonia and Polonia Gdańsk he made 59 appearances in Polish second division. He played with Orzeł Trąbki Wielkie for one season, retiring from playing at the end of the season.

Honours
Polonia Gdańsk
III liga (gr. Gdańsk): 1996–97

References

1973 births
Living people
Polish footballers
Polonia Gdańsk players
Lechia Gdańsk players
Association football defenders